Jisoo Park (born June 9, 1993), better known by his stage name NIve, is a South Korean singer-songwriter, producer, and composer. He made his first public appearance as a contestant in the South Korean talent show Superstar K 6, where he finished in the Top 9 (at the time appearing as Brian Park). NIve released his first single, "Getaway," with singer-songwriter JMSN on November 9, 2018. NIve has also written, composed, and produced songs for major K-pop artists, including BTS, NCT, Chen, Paul Kim and Sam Kim.

Early life
NIve was born Jisoo Park on June 9, 1993, in Seoul, South Korea. NIve listened to classical music as a child and he learned to play the clarinet in the fifth grade, which earned him prizes in competitions. During his first year in middle school, his family immigrated to the Gold Coast in Queensland, Australia. Feeling lonely in a new country, he joined the school choir upon his teacher's suggestion where he began to sing. NIve attended high school in New Jersey and enrolled in Mannes School of Music as the only clarinet major in 2012. Upon completing his first year, NIve took a leave of absence to pursue contemporary music and began busking and uploading videos on the platform YouTube.

Career 
Using the name Brian Park, he was a contestant on the sixth season of the talent show series Superstar K in 2014. Due to his well-received solo and group vocal performances by the judge panel, the Top 10 was extended to a Top 11 and he advanced through the competition. According to the ratings agency TNmS, in the program's first live episode, Park's rendition of "Even If I Close My Eyes" by  received the highest per-minute viewership in households with cable subscriptions among all competitors at 6.6%. Park progressed into the Top 9 and sang John Lennon's "All of Me", leading the judges to criticize his song choice. After calculations of the judges' scores and text votes were completed, Park received the lowest score and was eliminated from the competition.

He released his international debut single "Getaway" with American singer-songwriter JSMN in November 2018. He later signed with 153 Entertainment Group as a songwriter and wrote Chen's 2019 hit single "Beautiful Goodbye". In 2019, he released the singles "Who I Am", "Liberated" and "Tired". The following year, NIve released his single "Like a Fool" in collaboration with Sam Kim, for whom he had already wrote the song "Where's My Money", and wrote Paul Kim's "The Reason for My Spring". Following the song's release, he was contacted by V of BTS, with whom he wrote Blue & Grey for the band's fifth studio album Be. That same year, he released his first single album, titled Bandages, which included the songs "How Do I" and "New Light", and the single "2easy" in collaboration with Heize. He then wrote the song "My Everything" for NCT's second studio album, NCT 2020 Resonance, and participated in the online version of the JTBC's television show Begin Again. 

In June 2021, NIve released the song "Escape", which served as a pre-release single for his first extended play Broken Kaleidoscope, subsequently released in September. On August 13, he released a documentary on his YouTube channel describing his life after immigrating to Australia and how he started pursuing a career in the pop music scene as a classical clarinet player. Later that year, NIve released the digital single "Party Without U". On February 28, 2022, NIve released the single album Prolog?, which served as the first part of the LOG (Lessons on Growing) series.

Discography

Albums

Extended plays

Single albums

Singles

Soundtrack appearances

Filmography

Television

References 

1993 births
Living people
Mannes School of Music alumni
Singers from Seoul
South Korean clarinetists
South Korean composers
South Korean record producers
South Korean singer-songwriters
Superstar K participants